Janet Greenip (born , in Cincinnati, Ohio) was a Republican State Senator from Crofton, Maryland, representing District 33 from 2003 through 2009.

Education
Greenip received her B.S. in education in 1969 from Miami University in Oxford, Ohio.

Career

After college, Greenip had a career as a math teacher and statistician. In 1994, she ran for the Maryland House of Delegates and won a seat in District 33, along with fellow Republican, Robert C. Baldwin, and Democrat, Marsha G. Perry. One of the seats that was vacated was that of former Delegate John G. Gary, who was elected as the County Executive of Anne Arundel County. Greenip placed the House Ways and Means committee.

When incumbent Maryland State Senator Bob Neall switched parties from the GOP to the Democratic party, Janet Greenip ran against and defeated him, even though he had previously been the Anne Arundel County Executive from 1990 to 1994.

Greenip has been a long-term active member of the Republican Party. She was President of the Maryland Federation of Republican Women from 1990 to 1992. She is a current member of the Greater Crofton Republican Women, the Elephant Club, the Severna Park Republican Women, the Republican Women of Anne Arundel County, the Republican Professional Women and the West County Republican Club.

Greenip serves as a member of the board of directors of the Crofton Civic Association (district director; member, rules committee). She was a member of the board of directors for Helping Hand, Inc. from 1988 until 1991. Greenip was selected as Woman of the Year by the Republican Women of Anne Arundel County in 1990 and received as an award from Helping Hand, Inc., in 1991. Finally, she was selected as Hero of the Taxpayer by the Maryland Taxpayers Association in 2001.

Election results
2006 Race for Maryland State Senate – District 33
{| class="wikitable"
|-
!Name
!Votes
!Percent
!Outcome
|-
|-
|Janet Greenip, Rep.
|30,269
|  56.1%
|   Won
|-
|-
|Scott Hymes, Dem.
|23,689
|  43.9%
|   Lost
|-
|Other Write-Ins
|29
|  0.1%
|   Lost
|}

2002 Race for Maryland State Senate – District 33
{| class="wikitable"
|-
!Name
!Votes
!Percent
!Outcome
|-
|-
|Janet Greenip, Rep.
|27,512
|  54.2%
|   Won
|-
|-
|Robert R. Neall, Dem.
|23,236
|  45.8%
|   Lost
|-
|Other Write-Ins
|24
|  0.1%
|   Lost
|}

1998 Race for Maryland House of Delegates – District 33
Voters choose three:
{| class="wikitable"
|-
!Name
!Votes
!Percent
!Outcome
|-
|-
|Janet Greenip, Rep.
|23,256
|  20%
|   Won
|-
|-
|Robert C. Baldwin, Rep.
|23,050
|  20%
|   Won
|-
|-
|David Boschert, Rep.
|23,173
|  20%
|   Won
|-
|-
|Gayle Powell, Dem.
|16,145
|  14%
|   Lost
|-
|-
|Marcia Richard, Dem.
|15,210
|  13%
|   Lost
|-
|-
|Shelia Schneider, Dem.
|14,648
|  13%
|   Lost
|}

1994 Race for Maryland House of Delegates – District 33
Voters choose three:
{| class="wikitable"
|-
!Name
!Votes
!Percent
!Outcome
|-
|-
|Janet Greenip, Rep.
|19,545
|  20%
|   Won
|-
|-
|Robert C. Baldwin, Rep.
|19,628
|  20%
|   Won
|-
|-
|Marsha G. Perry, Dem.
|17,618
|  18%
|   Won
|-
|-
|David Almy, Rep.
|16,390
|  17%
|   Lost
|-
|-
|David G. Boschert, Dem.
|13,485
|  14%
|   Lost
|-
|-
|Michael F. Canning, Dem.
|12,157
|  12%
|   Lost
|}

References

External links
 Campaign Site
 Official MD State Senate Site
Project Vote Smart - Janet Hines Greenip profile
Follow the Money - Janet Greenip
2006 2004 2002 1998 campaign contributions

Republican Party Maryland state senators
Republican Party members of the Maryland House of Delegates
1947 births
Living people
People from Crofton, Maryland
Miami University alumni
21st-century American politicians